, or "Stadium of the National Sport", may refer to the following sumo venues:

 Ryōgoku Kokugikan, both the original that existed from 1909 to 1982, and the current building opened in 1985
 Kuramae Kokugikan, built in Tokyo, that existed from 1950 to 1984
 Osaka Kokugikan, that existed from 1919 until 1953

th:เรียวโงกุ โคกุงิกัง